Gibberidea is a genus of fungi in the class Dothideomycetes. The relationship of this taxon to other taxa within the class is unknown (incertae sedis). The genus was named by German mycologist Karl Wilhelm Gottlieb Leopold Fuckel in 1870.

Species
Gibberidea abutilonis
Gibberidea alnicola
Gibberidea andina
Gibberidea artemisiae
Gibberidea cinerea
Gibberidea heliopsidis
Gibberidea lenarsii
Gibberidea obducens
Gibberidea ribesia
Gibberidea visci
Gibberidea zingiberacearum
Gibberidea ziziphi

See also
List of Dothideomycetes genera incertae sedis

References

Dothideomycetes enigmatic taxa
Dothideomycetes genera
Taxa named by Karl Wilhelm Gottlieb Leopold Fuckel
Taxa described in 1870